"Ghosts Again" is a song by English electronic band Depeche Mode. It was released on 9 February 2023 as the lead single from their fifteenth studio album, Memento Mori.

Background
The song marks the first single release since the death of co-founder and keyboardist Andy Fletcher in May 2022. To Dave Gahan, the song "captures this perfect balance of melancholy and joy", while Martin Gore added that the song has "such an upbeat feel to it" and how rare it is for the band to record a song that "I just don't get sick of listening to".

Composition
In light of the death of Fletcher, the "reflective, mid-tempo" synth-pop song sees the two members commenting on motifs of death: the fragility of life and the possibility of an afterlife. Throughout the song, the duo keeps reminding the listener that every life will eventually turn into "ghosts again". However, it also gives the idea of being reunited with one another in some form, possibly as "ghosts".

Richard Butler of Psychedelic Furs is co-credited with lyrics and composition.

Music video
The music video was released on 9 February 2023. It was directed by longtime visual collaborator Anton Corbijn. The story focuses on Gore and Gahan reenacting the chess game with Death in Ingmar Bergman's The Seventh Seal (1958) on an urban rooftop. It alternates with scenes of the two performing in a cemetery.

Track listing 
Volt Magazin confirmed that "Sundown", a cover song by Gordon Lightfoot (attributed to Scott Walker), will appear on upcoming CD, vinyl and digital versions of the single. The band also performed the song for BBC Radio 2's "Piano Room": "Depeche Mode's Piano Room will be broadcast on Thursday, April 6 and their classic cover is a track by Scott Walker, with their session accompanied by the BBC Concert Orchestra."

Charts

References

2023 singles
2023 songs
Columbia Records singles
Depeche Mode songs
Music videos directed by Anton Corbijn
Black-and-white music videos
Song recordings produced by James Ford (musician)
Songs written by Martin Gore